Phillip Roger Bickford (born July 10, 1995) is an American professional baseball pitcher for the Los Angeles Dodgers of Major League Baseball (MLB). He has previously played in MLB for the Milwaukee Brewers.

Amateur career
Bickford attended Oaks Christian School in Westlake Village, California. He was drafted by the Toronto Blue Jays 10th overall in the 2013 Major League Baseball Draft but did not sign with the team. He attended California State University, Fullerton for his freshman year. After his freshman season in 2014, he played collegiate summer baseball for the Yarmouth–Dennis Red Sox of the Cape Cod Baseball League, where he posted a 1.63 earned run average with 44 strikeouts over 27.2 innings pitched, helped lead the Red Sox to the league championship, and was named the league's Outstanding Pro Prospect. Prior to his sophomore year, he transferred to the College of Southern Nevada in order to be eligible for the 2015 draft. He was selected by the San Francisco Giants as the 18th overall pick in that draft.

Professional career

San Francisco Giants
Bickford signed with the Giants for $2,333,800 and was assigned to the AZL Giants, where he spent the whole season, pitching to a 0–1 record and 2.01 ERA in ten games started. He began the 2016 season with the Augusta GreenJackets and was promoted to the San Jose Giants in June.

Milwaukee Brewers
On August 1, 2016, the Giants traded Bickford and Andrew Susac to the Milwaukee Brewers for Will Smith. Milwaukee assigned him to the Brevard County Manatees where he finished the season. In 23 total games (22 started) between Augusta, San Jose and Brevard County, Bickford posted a 7–7 record and 2.93 ERA as well as striking out 135 batters in 120 combined innings between the three clubs. He pitched only 17 innings in 2017 (with the AZL Brewers) due to a 50-game suspension for testing positive for banned substances and a broken hand. Bickford spent 2018 and 2019 with the Advanced Single-A Carolina Mudcats. Over 21 games in 2018 he carried a 4.60 ERA and turned it into a 2.48 ERA over 20 games in 2019.

On September 1, 2020, Bickford was selected to the major leagues for the first time and made his MLB debut that night.

On April 28, 2021, Bickford was designated for assignment to clear roster space for the recently selected Zack Godley. He had allowed two earned runs in one inning of work up to that point in the year.

Los Angeles Dodgers
On May 3, 2021, Bickford was claimed off waivers by the Los Angeles Dodgers. On June 10, Bickford picked up his first career save against the Pittsburgh Pirates. On July 25, Bickford recorded his first career MLB win against the Colorado Rockies. He pitched in 56 games for the Dodgers in 2021, posting a 4–2 record with a 2.50 ERA and 59 strikeouts in  innings. Bickford pitched in three games in each of the 2021 NLDS and 2021 NLCS, he allowed four hits but no runs in six total innings.

During the 2022 season, Bickford pitched in 60 games for the Dodgers, with a 2–1 record and 4.72 ERA. On September 23, Albert Pujols hit his 700th career home run off of him.

Personal
Bickford was born in Newbury Park, California. He has one brother and four sisters.

References

External links

1995 births
Living people
People from Ventura, California
Sportspeople from Ventura County, California
Baseball players from California
Major League Baseball pitchers
Milwaukee Brewers players
Los Angeles Dodgers players
Cal State Fullerton Titans baseball players
Southern Nevada Coyotes baseball players
Yarmouth–Dennis Red Sox players
Arizona League Giants players
Augusta GreenJackets players
San Jose Giants players
Brevard County Manatees players
Arizona League Brewers players
Carolina Mudcats players
Oklahoma City Dodgers players